Newton Aycliffe RUFC is a rugby union team based in Newton Aycliffe, County Durham in north-east England, they are based at Newton Aycliffe Sports Club on Moore Lane. The club currently competes in Durham/Northumberland 3 the ninth tier of the English rugby union system.

History
The rugby club was founded in 1958 

Newton Aycliffe were relegated to Durham/Northumberland 3 after relegation from Durham/Northumberland 2 in 2018

Due to a lack of players, the club resigned from the League in 2021. After rebuilding they currently play in the Durham Tees Valley Social League.

The club are based at Newton Aycliffe Sports Club, Moore Lane, Newton Aycliffe.

Honours 
Durham County
Plate Winners (2) 2010-11, 2013-14
Durham/Northumberland 3 Champions (2) 1992-93, 2016-17

Durham/Northumberland 4 Champions (3) 1989-90, 1999-2000, 2003-04

References

External links 
 Newton Aycliffe RUFC
 Newton Aycliffe Sports Club

Rugby clubs established in 1958
English rugby union teams
Rugby union in County Durham